Encheliophis chardewalli is a species of fish described by Parmentier in 2004. Encheliophis chardewalli is part of the genus Encheliophis and the Carapidae family.

References 

Carapidae